{{Infobox settlement
| name                     = Cianjhen
| official_name            = Cianjhen District{{refn|group=Note|name=usage|Use of the term Cianjhen in various contexts:Academia: Domestic/ International
Government: Central/ Municipal/ District/ International
Journalism: Domestic/ International}}
| native_name              = 
| native_name_lang         = zh-hant
| other_name               = Qianzhen
| settlement_type          = District
| translit_lang1           = 
| translit_lang1_type      = 
| translit_lang1_info      = 
| image_skyline            = Kaohsiung-skyline-2018.jpg
| imagesize                = 
| image_alt                = 
| image_caption            = Skyline of Kaohsiung viewed from Cianjhen Star
| image_map                = Cianjhen KH.svg
| image_blank_emblem       = File:前鎮_Cianjhen_高雄市前鎮區公所_Cianjhen_District_Office,_Kaohsiung_City.png
| blank_emblem_type        =  Cianjhen
| mapsize                  = 
| map_alt                  = 
| map_caption              = Cianjhen District in Kaohsiung City
| subdivision_type         = Country
| subdivision_name         = Taiwan
| subdivision_type1        = City
| subdivision_name1        = Kaohsiung
| named_for                = 
| seat_type                = 
| seat                     = 
| parts_type               = Divisions
| parts_style              = 
| parts                    = 
| p1                       = 
| p2                       = 
| government_footnotes     = 
| government_type          = 
| governing_body           = 
| leader_party             = 
| leader_title             = 
| leader_name              = 
| area_footnotes           = 
| area_total_km2           = 
| area_rank                = 
| population_footnotes     = 
| population_total         = 180407
| population_as_of         = January 2023
| population_rank          = 
| population_density_km2   = auto
| postal_code_type         = Postal code
| postal_code              = 
| website                  =  
}}Cianjhen District''' is a district in Kaohsiung City, Taiwan. The District has a population is 180,407, as of January 2023. It is the fifth-most populated district in Kaohsiung, with a population density of 9,457 people per square kilometer, or 24,494 people per square mile.

History
On July 31, 2014, the 2014 Kaohsiung gas explosions occurred in the district and in nearby Lingya District.

Administrative divisions

The district consists of Caoya, Mingxiao, Mingzheng, Mingyi, Renai, Dechang, Pingdeng, Pingchang, Mingli, Xinyi, Xinde, Mingdao, Xinghua, Xingren, Qianzhen, Zhentung, Zhenrong, Zhenchang, Zhenhai, Zhenyang, Xingbang, Zhenzhong, Zhenbei, Zhongchun, Zhongcheng, Xishan, Minquan, Jianlong, Zhenxing, Lianghe, Xijia, Chengxing, Chengfeng, Xingzhong, Xingtung, Zhongxiao, Fuguo, Zhunei, Zhutung, Zhunan, Zhubei, Zhuxi, Zhuzhong, Ruizhu, Ruinan, Ruifeng, Ruixiang, Ruitung, Ruihe, Ruiping, Ruilong, Ruibei, Ruixi, Ruigang, Ruixing, Ruicheng, Ruiwen, Ruihua and Ruichang Village.

Government agencies
 Fisheries Agency
 National Academy of Marine Research
 Ocean Affairs Council
 Southern Backup Center of Central Emergency Operation Center

Education
 Kaohsiung Municipal Ruei-Siang Senior High School

Infrastructure
 Nanpu Power Plant

Tourist attractions
 Dream Mall
 Guanghua Night Market
 Jin-Zuan Night Market
 Kaisyuan Night Market
 Kaohsiung Exhibition Center
 Kaohsiung Museum of Fisheries Civilization
 Taroko Park
 Bao An Temple
 Chia Jhen Park
 Ciao Ya Jhao Yang Temple
 Da Cheng Temple
 Er Sheng Park
 Fo Gong Tien Ho Temple
 Gang Shan Zih Park
 Gao Cie Jin Luan Temple
 Guang Ji Temple
 Jhen Nan Temple
 Jhen Sian Temple
 Labor Park
 Long Feng Temple
 Min Chuan Park
 Ming Sing Fo Temple
 Ming Sin She Jing Shan Temple
 Sheng Sing Park
 Sheng Tien Temple
 Shuai Sing Fo Temple
 Sian De Temple
 Sin Che Chan Temple
 Sing Ren Park
 Yi-Guan Dao Tian Tai Sheng Temple

Transportation
Cianjhen is served by the following metro stations:
 Kaohsiung MRT: Caoya, Cianjhen Senior High School, Kaisyuan, Sanduo Shopping District and Shihjia
 Kaohsiung LRT: Cianjhen Star, Lizihnei
Cianjhen is the southern terminus of Freeway 1, while Provincial Highway 17 also runs through the district.

Notable natives
 Yen Teh-fa, Minister of National Defense
 Huang Ching-ya, local politician

See also
 Chienchen River
 China Steel Corporation Headquarters
 Farglory THE ONE skyscraper

Notes

References

External links 

 
 

Districts of Kaohsiung